The 2009 ICC World Cricket League Africa Region Division Three was a cricket tournament in Malawi, taking place between 3 and 7 October 2009. It gave six African Associate and Affiliate members of the International Cricket Council experience of international one-day cricket and formed part of the global World Cricket League structure.

The top two teams, Malawi and Sierra Leone was promoted to Division 2.

Teams

There were 5 teams that played in the tournament, Morocco withdrew due to visa problems. These teams were non-test member nations of the African Cricket Association. The teams that played were:

Squads

Group stage

Points Table

Fixtures

Statistics

International cricket competitions in 2009
2009, 3
International cricket competitions in Malawi